Chaumette is a French surname. Notable people with the surname include:

François Chaumette (1923–1996), French actor
Franois Chaumette, French engineer
Monique Chaumette (born 1927), French actress
Pierre Gaspard Chaumette (1763–1794), French politician

French-language surnames